Kirket is a 2019 Indian Hindi-language Indian film directed by Yogendra Singh, starring Kirti Azad, Vishal Tiwari, Sonam Chhabra, Sonu Jha, Jai Kumar. The film depicts the state of the Bihar Cricket Board.

Plot 
Kirket is a sports film that portrays the state of the Bihar Cricket Board. The story revolves around Kirti Azad, who was a cricketer and part of the 1983 Indian Cricket World Cup team. Now he tries to single-handedly tries to change the future of the Bihar Cricket Board for the better but is met with many obstacles. The movie is a mix of fact and fiction and also touches on various sensitive subjects such as caste-based and religious politics that are inherently part of the system.

Cast 

 Kirti Azad
 Vishal Tiwari
 Sonam Chhabra
 Sonu Jha
 Jai Kumar
 Saifullah Rehmani
 Gauri Shankar
 Dev Singh
 Maninder Singh
 Ajay Upadhyay

References

External links 
 

2010s Hindi-language films
Indian sports films